Bến Cầu is a rural district of Tây Ninh province in the Southeast region of Vietnam. , the district had a population of 62,664. The district covers an area of 229 km². The district capital lies at Bến Cầu.

References

Districts of Tây Ninh province